St Ives Shopping Village is a shopping centre in the suburb of St Ives in Sydney's Upper North Shore. It opened in the 1960s and included a supermarket and over 40 stores. In  the 1970s St Ives Shopping Village became the main commercial area for St Ives and now has over 100 stores. The main major tenants are Harris Farm Markets, Coles and Woolworths. It is across the road from the Village Green and the skate park.

References

External links 
 http://stivesvillage.com.au/
 http://stivesvillage.com.au/village-life/

Shopping centres in Sydney
Shopping malls established in 1960
St Ives, New South Wales